Ulidia parallela is a species of ulidiid or picture-winged fly in the genus Ulidia of the family Tephritidae.

References

Ulidia
Insects described in 1845